is a Japanese former basketball player who played for Chanson V-Magic of the Women's Japan Basketball League.She won a silver medal with the Japan women's national basketball team at the 1994 Asian Games.

References

1969 births
Living people
Asian Games silver medalists for Japan
Japanese women's basketball players
People from Yuzawa, Akita
Sportspeople from Akita Prefecture
Asian Games medalists in basketball
Medalists at the 1994 Asian Games
Basketball players at the 1994 Asian Games